The barred danio (Devario pathirana) is a fish belonging to the minnow family (Cyprinidae).  Originating in Sri Lanka, this fish grows to a maximum length of 2 inches (6 cm).

In the wild, the barred danio is understood to be critically endangered, but is freely available from captive-bred stock. Typically, the fish prefer water with a 6.0-8.0 pH, a water hardness of 5.0-19.0 dGH, and an ideal temperature range of 69-79 °F (20-26 °C).  Its diet consists of annelid worms, small crustaceans, and insects.  The barred danio is oviparous (an egg layer), and is found mostly in the Nilwala River basin.

References

External links
Devario pathirana

Devario
Cyprinid fish of Asia
Freshwater fish of Sri Lanka
Fish described in 1990
Taxa named by Maurice Kottelat
Taxa named by Rohan Pethiyagoda